Ulyadarovka is a rural locality (a khutor) in Fyodorovsky Selsoviet, Fyodorovsky District, Bashkortostan, Russia. The population was 11 as of 2010. There is 1 street.

Geography 
Ulyadarovka is located 11 km northeast of Fyodorovka (the district's administrative centre) by road. Kuzminovka is the nearest rural locality.

References 

Rural localities in Fyodorovsky District